Tommi Grönlund (born 9 December 1969) is a retired Finnish professional football player.

External links
 

1969 births
Living people
Finnish footballers
Finland international footballers
Helsingin Jalkapalloklubi players
Veikkausliiga players
Finnish expatriate footballers
Expatriate men's footballers in Denmark
Viborg FF players
Danish Superliga players
Expatriate footballers in Sweden
Ljungskile SK players
Trelleborgs FF players
Allsvenskan players
Expatriate footballers in Scotland
Scottish Premier League players
Heart of Midlothian F.C. players
Helsingborgs IF players
FinnPa players
Association football midfielders
Footballers from Helsinki
20th-century Finnish people